Weining Yi Hui and Miao Autonomous County is a county of Guizhou, China. It is under the administration of the prefecture-level city of Bijie.

Notable attractions include Majie Ethnic Yi Village, the historic site of Shimenkan church and Caohai Lake nature reserve. In the early 20th century, the village of Shimenkan was known as the Overseas Heaven and a sacred civilized area due to the contributions by Rev. Sam Pollard, a British Methodist missionary.

Climate
Weining has a subtropical highland climate (Köppen Cwb). Over two-thirds of the annual rainfall occurs from June to September.

Transportation 
Weining is served by the G7611 Duyun–Shangri-La Expressway, the Weining–Xuanwei Expressway, the Bijie–Weining Expressway, China National Highway 326 and by the Neijiang-Liupanshui Railway. Weining Caohai Airport is under construction.

References

External links
Official website of Weining Government

County-level divisions of Guizhou
Bijie
Hui autonomous counties
Yi autonomous counties
Miao autonomous counties